Chevron Lubricants Lanka PLC is a manufacturer, distributor and marketer of Petroleum-based lubricants in Sri Lanka. The company is one of the constituents of the S&P Sri Lanka 20 Index and the Chevron Corporation holds a controlling stake (51.00%) of the company's stocks. The company offers engine oils, gear oils, transmission oils under the brand name Havoline while offering diesel vehicle engine oils, industrial lubricants, coolants, brake fluids under the brand name Delo. For the financial year 2019/20, Chevron Lubricants Lanka was ranked 67th in LMD 100, a list of listed companies by revenue in Sri Lanka.

History
The company was incorporated in 1992 and in 1996 was listed on the Colombo Stock Exchange. The Government of Sri Lanka through its privatisation initiative sold its stake of 51 per cent in Lanka Lubricants Limited to Caltex International in 1994. In 2007, the company was renamed Chevron Lubricants Lanka Ltd from Caltex Lubricants Lanka. The renaming was done in connection with the global branding and to clarify the organisation's identity.

Operations
Muhammad Najam Shamsuddin was appointed as the new managing director/CEO of the company in September 2020 after Patrick McCloud resigned from the position. Kishu Gomes is the former managing director/CEO of the company and after 22 years of service quit the post in 2018. In the third quarter of 2020, despite the effects of the COVID-19 pandemic sales of the company rose compared to the second of the year and the third quarter of 2019. Chevron Lubricants Lanka operates a blending plant in Sapugaskanda. Brand Finance ranked Caltex 72nd in the 100 most valuable brands in Sri Lanka.

See also
 List of companies listed on the Colombo Stock Exchange
 List of Sri Lankan public corporations by market capitalisation

References

External links
 

1992 establishments in Sri Lanka
Chevron Corporation
Companies listed on the Colombo Stock Exchange
Manufacturing companies based in Colombo